Julián Baldomero Acuña Galé (27 February 1900 – 24 July 1973) was a Cuban born botanist who served as director of the Agricultural Experimental Station in Santiago de Las Vegas. His research centered on phytopathology and on introduction of new, improved varieties of food and forage plants while his field work produced numerous herbarium collections; among them, many new species he described, or were named for him.

Acuña Galé was born in Camagüey, Cuba, and died in Mexico City, Mexico.

In 1980, Acunaeanthus was published, which is a genus of flowering plants in the family of Rubiaceae. The genus  which is endemic to Cuba was named in honour of Julián Acuña Galé.

References

Bibliography
WorldCat

Botanists with author abbreviations
1900 births
1973 deaths
Cuban botanists
Cuban scientists
Botanists active in the Caribbean
20th-century botanists